Hello, Mannequin is the seventh album released by Joy Electric.

Hello, Mannequin is the third release in the Legacy series and was created using the Roland System 100 synthesizer. It is the final Joy Electric album to be created using the System 100.

Reception 

In its album review, The Orange County Register described Joy Electric's sound: "Think early Depeche Mode meets '80s synth pop meets Star Trek sound effects." It said that "those who dig experimental records should embrace it."

Track listing
"Hello, Mannequin"  – 1:58
"Disloyalist Party"  – 4:26
"The Works of Unknowns"  – 4:53
"The Singing Arc"  – 4:06
"Song for All Time"  – 3:51
"The Birth of the Telegram, 1814"  – 3:17
"Who Are Friends?"  – 4:04
"Wolf in the Bend"  – 4:57
"From Mount Chorus"  – 3:13
"The Phonograph Plays, Part and Parcel"  – 4:02
"Nikola Tesla"  – 4:38
"Post Calendar"  – 4:28
"I Am a Pioneer"  – 3:52
"A Page of Life"  – 4:48

References 

2004 albums
Joy Electric albums
Tooth & Nail Records albums